Snow Park was a dedicated snowsports terrain park in the South Island of New Zealand. It described itself as the "first dedicated freestyle terrain park in the world" when it opened in 2002, and featured a number of half-pipes, jumps and rails, instead of traditional ski runs. It closed in 2013 and was sold to the neighbouring Southern Hemisphere Proving Grounds, a vehicle testing facility.

On-mountain accommodation was available after 2006, prior to which people needed to commute daily from Wanaka or Queenstown. The site shared an access road with nearby Snow Farm.

The park and surrounding land was owned by the Lee family for sixty years, before it was put up for sale in September 2008, for $30 million.

References

External links
Snow Park

Ski areas and resorts in Otago
Wānaka